Straight Through is a 1925 American silent Western film directed by Arthur Rosson and starring William Desmond, Marguerite Clayton and Albert J. Smith.

Cast
 William Desmond as Good Deed O'Day 
 Marguerite Clayton as Denver Nell 
 Albert J. Smith as Granger 
 Ruth Stonehouse as Mary Snowden 
 Frank Brownlee as Bill Higgins 
 William Gillis as Sheriff 
 George F. Marion as Parson Sanderson

References

Bibliography
 Munden, Kenneth White. The American Film Institute Catalog of Motion Pictures Produced in the United States, Part 1. University of California Press, 1997.

External links
 

1925 films
1925 Western (genre) films
American black-and-white films
Films directed by Arthur Rosson
Silent American Western (genre) films
Universal Pictures films
1920s English-language films
1920s American films